Jyoti is a 1988 Bengali film directed by Shabda Kumar and produced by  Asis Ray. The film features actors Prosenjit Chatterjee and Anuradha Patel in the lead roles. Music of the film has been composed by Sapan Jagmohan.
This film also dubbed in Hindi as Amber (1984).

Cast 
 Prosenjit Chatterjee
 Anuradha Patel
 Utpal Dutta
 Tarun Kumar
 Pradip Kumar
 Rakesh Bedi
 Chand Osmani

Soundtrack
Songs of this film are very popular. Lyricist Gouri Prasanna Majumder and Pulak Banerjee.

Bengali

Hindi (dubbed)
Lyricist Mahendra Dehlvi, Gauhar Kanpuri and Shabda Kumar.

References 

1988 films
Bengali-language Indian films
Films scored by Sapan-Jagmohan
1980s Bengali-language films